Mashallah News is a novel platform to cover major cities in North Africa, the Middle East, Turkey and Iran. The website was launched in November 2010 with an initial coverage of six main cities in the region, and now covers fourteen different capitals and major urban areas. It is run by a collective of young journalists, graphic designers, photographers, and translators who come from diverse backgrounds and are either born in the region or chose to make it their home. Mashallah news was created in order to contrast mainstream news coverage in the area that focuses on geopolitics, war, and international politics. The founders are independent journalists who strive to tell the story of regions and people that have different narratives that had previously been neglected.

Background
Mashallah News aims to display what is playfully called disoriented information about urban life in places like Istanbul, Jeddah, Cairo, Tehran, Ramallah, Beirut and beyond, in stories that have important societal implications. The focus of these stories is on urban life, culture, and society; aspects of life that the mainstream media often ignores. Run by a core team of four editors and one graphic designer, as well as teams of contributors from across the region, Mashallah News gathers people with diverse experiences and skills to share less-told stories and inspiring work from a region in transformation. Creative get-to gathers, workshops and a print version with ‘the best of’ stories are in the works, to extend the emerging alternative public sphere even further. Additionally, the team has also released a book, Beirut Re-Collected, featuring a series of "forgotten stories" from the city.

Their Story
The following is a poem from the Mashallah News Facebook page. It gives interesting insight into the interests, roots, and goals of the Mashallah News team.

"We were born: in 2010, at the end of a long and hot summer.

We come from: all over the Mediterranean sea and beyond. We were born and bred OR chose to live in the region.

We aim at: spreading a new outlook on countries from Morocco to Iran, everywhere the word Mashallah is used, thanks to our team of people reporting from major cities in the region.

We are interested in: underground cultural scenes, social taboos, multilingualism, identity crises, organic wine, urban planning, body painting, humor, art, contradictions and untold stories.

We are tired of: cultural propaganda, bribes, scape-goats, Lawrence of Arabia, CNN, ill-informed foreign correspondents, camels, Samuel Huntington, pollution, palm trees and flying carpets.

We believe in: describing cultural change, social issues and the unexpected, rather than repeating stereotypes and simpleminded images.

We speak: English, French and Arabic, hoping to expand to other tongues as well"

Features
- The website features an interactive map that indicates where the stories/newsworthy moments take place. This allows for increased ability to access content from places of interest to the reader.

- Mashallah News also has a blog which is updated regularly with miscellaneous graphics, videos and sounds that represent the spirit of Mashallah News.

- Mashallah News accepts submissions from anyone willing to send in work that can be non-fiction, photo and video submissions, artistic work, investigative journalism and/or experimental prose.

Awards
 Mashallah News was the 2001 winner of the World Summit Youth Award in CultureIn 2011.
 In 2012, co-editor Sophie Chamas won the Anna Lindh Mediterranean Journalist Award in the “New Media” section, for her article “Ani mi Levanon”.
 In 2014, Mashallah was selected for the 4M Mashreq programme, a supportive training for emerging online media projects in the Levant.
 In 2014, Mashallah News was nominated for the Prix Ars Electronica award in the category of Digital Communities.

References

External links
Mashallah News Site
Reputable Companies

2010 establishments in Lebanon
Internet properties established in 2010
Lebanese news websites